Popovka is a rural locality (a selo) and the administrative center of Popovskoye Rural Settlement, Rossoshansky District, Voronezh Oblast, Russia. The population was 2,507 as of 2010. There are 33 streets.

Geography 
Popovka is located 16 km north of Rossosh (the district's administrative centre) by road. Sud-Nikolayevka is the nearest rural locality.

References 

Rural localities in Rossoshansky District